Pitavia is a genus of plant in family Rutaceae. It contains the following species (but this list may be incomplete):
 Pitavia punctata, (R. & P.) Mol.

References 

 
Zanthoxyloideae genera
Taxonomy articles created by Polbot